Hubert Bourdy (5 March 1957 – 25 June 2014) was a French equestrian and Olympic medalist. He was born in Troyes. He won a bronze medal in show jumping at the 1988 Summer Olympics in Seoul.

References

1957 births
2014 deaths
French male equestrians
Olympic equestrians of France
Olympic bronze medalists for France
Equestrians at the 1988 Summer Olympics
Equestrians at the 1992 Summer Olympics
Olympic medalists in equestrian
Medalists at the 1992 Summer Olympics
Medalists at the 1988 Summer Olympics
Competitors at the 1983 Mediterranean Games
Sportspeople from Troyes
Horse trader
Mediterranean Games competitors for France
Mediterranean Games gold medalists for France
Mediterranean Games silver medalists for France
Mediterranean Games medalists in equestrian